Sürmene knife. Being 15–20 cm in height, Sürmene knife has sharp or round tip and the section between incisive part and handle is embroidered by carving. Built in Sürmene at least since Byzantine times.

References

Trabzon Province
Knives